Lester Howard "Red" Corzine (January 19, 1909 – July 26, 2003) was an American football fullback who played five seasons in the National Football League with the Cincinnati Reds, St. Louis Gunners and New York Giants. He played college football at Davis & Elkins College. He first enrolled at Anna High School in Anna, Illinois before transferring to Monmouth High School in Monmouth, Illinois.

References

External links
Just Sports Stats

1909 births
2003 deaths
Players of American football from Illinois
American football fullbacks
American football linebackers
Davis & Elkins Senators football players
Cincinnati Reds (NFL) players
St. Louis Gunners players
New York Giants players
People from Union County, Illinois